Inside is the second album by German rock band Eloy. It was released in 1973.

Track listing
All songs written by Eloy
Side one
 "Land of No Body" – 17:14

Side two
"Inside" – 6:35
 "Future City" – 5:35
 "Up and Down" – 8:23

Bonus tracks on 2000 Digital Remaster

 "Daybreak" – 3:39
 "On the Road" – 2:30

Personnel
Frank Bornemann – guitar, vocals, percussion
Manfred Wieczorke – organ, vocals, guitar, percussion
Wolfgang Stocker – bass guitar
Fritz Randow – drums, acoustic guitar, percussion, flute

References

External links

1973 albums
Eloy (band) albums
Harvest Records albums